Star Bag is an album by saxophonist Willis Jackson which was recorded in 1968 and released on the Prestige label.

Track listing 
All compositions by Willis Jackson except where noted.
 "Star Bag" – 7:35    
 "The Girl from Ipanema" (Antônio Carlos Jobim, Vinícius de Moraes, Norman Gimbel) – 5:55    
 "Good to the Damn Bone" (Jackson, Bill Jennings) – 5:38    
 "More" (Riz Ortolani, Nino Oliviero, Norman Newell) – 7:25    
 "Smoke Rings" (Gene Gifford, Ned Washington) – 6:00    
 "Yellow Days" (Alan Bernstein, Álvaro Carrillo) – 5:45

Personnel 
Willis Jackson – tenor saxophone
Trudy Pitts – organ
Bill Jennings – guitar
Jimmy Lewis – electric bass
Bobby Donaldson – drums
Victor Allende – congas

References 

Willis Jackson (saxophonist) albums
1968 albums
Prestige Records albums
Albums recorded at Van Gelder Studio
Albums produced by Cal Lampley